Procopius of Ustyug ( or Святой Прокопий Любекский, ; 1243? —  in Veliky Ustyug) was a fool for Christ (yurodivy), a miracle worker, saint of Russian Orthodox Church, formerly a merchant from Lübeck. He was born in Germany, a Roman Catholic merchant who converted to Eastern Orthodox Christianity during his travels.

Though he is sometimes identified as one Jacob Potharst, son of a Lübeck merchant, Procopius' worldly name, surname, date and place of birth are not reliably determined. In 1818 the universal celebration of the saint was established.

St. Procopius lived as yurodivy for 60 years. In 1290 he predicted the fall of meteorite near Veliky Ustyug, as well as tornado and conflagration.

The incorrupt relics of St. Procopius were discovered in the 18th century near the Entry of the Theotokos parish church in Veliky Ustyug and placed in the church, where they remained in open view for two hundred years, being the source of numerous healings.

References

External links 

 
 

1303 deaths
Yurodivy
14th-century Christian saints
Converts to Eastern Orthodoxy from Roman Catholicism
Miracle workers
Russian saints of the Eastern Orthodox Church
Year of birth unknown